Synersaga caradjai is a moth in the family Lecithoceridae. It is found in Taiwan.

The wingspan is 30 mm, making it one of the largest species in the family Lecithoceridae.

References

Moths described in 1978
caradjai